Celso José da Costa (born April 7, 1949 in Congonhinhas) is a Brazilian mathematician working in differential geometry. His research activity has focused in the construction and classification of minimal surfaces embedded in three-dimensional Euclidean space. He is best known for his discovery of Costa's minimal surface, which was described in 1982.

He earned his Ph.D. from IMPA in 1982 under the supervision of Manfredo do Carmo.

References

External links
 Academia Brasileira de Ciências – Celso José da Costa (in Portuguese)

1949 births
Living people
Differential geometers
Instituto Nacional de Matemática Pura e Aplicada alumni
20th-century Brazilian mathematicians